Lenka Rabasović was a Serbian heroine who fought as an irregular during World War I.

Biography
Lenka Pjević was born in Bioska. She had four brothers. She joined her father's unit of irregulars in 1916. After learning how to use different weapons, she fought bravely against the enemy during World War I. She also served as a messenger, maintaining communication between different units. She was wounded once but lived to see liberation in 1918. Two years later, she married Mališu Rabasovića in Mačvanski Prnjavor and went on to have seven children.

References

Serbian women in World War I
People from Zlatibor District